Tadhg Riabhach Ó Dubhda (died 1432) was King of Uí Fiachrach Muaidhe.

Tadhg Riabhach is the last Ó Dubhda expressly listed as King of Uí Fiachrach Muaidhe in any contemporary or near-contemporary document. Araile do fhlathaibh Ua nDubhda says of him:

 Tadhg Riabhach Ua Dubhda mac Domnaill Clerigh, ri Ua fFiachrach, d'écc in Esgir Abhann iar fflaithius 15 bliadhan. Ingean Uí Maille mathair Ruaidrí remhráite agus an Taidcc-si ("Tadhg Riabhach Ó Dubhda s. Domhnall Cléireach, king of Uí Fhiachrach, died in Eiscir Abhann after a reign of 15 years. The daughter of Ó Máille was the mother of Ruaidhrí" (Ruaidhrí Ó Dubhda) "aforementioned and of this Tadhg.")

References
 The History of Mayo, Hubert T. Knox, p. 379, 1908.
 Araile do fhlathaibh Ua nDubhda/Some of the princes of Ui Dhubhda, pp. 676–681, Leabhar na nGenealach:The Great Book of Irish Genealogies, Dubhaltach Mac Fhirbhisigh (died 1671), eag. Nollaig Ó Muraíle, 2004–05, De Burca, Dublin.

People from County Sligo
15th-century Irish monarchs
1432 deaths
Year of birth unknown